Esche may refer to:

People
 Annemarie Esche (1925–2018), German scholar of Burmese literature
 Charles Esche (born 1963), English museum curator
 Eberhard Esche (1933–2006), German actor
 Robert Esche (born 1978), American ice hockey player

Places
 Esche, Lower Saxony, Germany